The Royal Army Medical College (RAMC) was located on a site south of the Tate Gallery (now known as Tate Britain) on Millbank, in Westminster, London, overlooking the River Thames. The college moved from the site in 1999 and the buildings are now occupied by the Chelsea College of Arts. The area around the college including the Tate, former military hospital and other adjacent areas is a conservation area. The former college buildings are now listed.

History

The site, including that of the Tate Gallery (which opened in 1897), was previously occupied by the Millbank Prison from 1821 to the late 19th century. The college was built by John Henry Townsend and Wilfred Ainslie in Imperial Baroque style. They also designed the adjoining Regimental Officers' Mess and Commandant's House, in French Renaissance style. The buildings were opened by King Edward VII and Queen Alexandra on 15 May 1907. A statue of Sir James McGrigor, the father of army medicine, originally at the Royal Hospital, Chelsea was moved to the grounds in 1907 and then moved again to the Royal Military Academy Sandhurst in 2000.

Queen Alexandra Military Hospital was built to the north of the Tate Gallery and opened in 1905. Sir Cooper Perry was knighted in 1903 for helping set up the college.

During the First World War the college was used to prepare vaccines, including a vaccine against typhoid which was developed at the college. The college also researched into protection against chemical warfare including the development of gas masks here. In the second World War, the college provided courses in tropical medicine. The college was seriously damaged in 1941 by bombs and the walls of the Tate Gallery nearby still show signs of the damage.

The Royal Army Medical College became the post graduate training wing of the Royal Defence Medical College in April 1996.

After teaching transferred to the Royal Hospital Haslar in Gosport in 1999, the college closed and the buildings were subsequently occupied by the Chelsea College of Arts.

Commandants of the Royal Army Medical College

(Dates in parentheses are years of service)
Colonel H. E. R. James (1902–1908)
Colonel D. Wardrop (1908–1911)
Colonel E. J. Risk (1911–1912)
Major-General Bruce Morland Skinner  (1912–14)
Major-General Sir David Bruce KCB, FRS, (1914–1919)
Major-General S. Guise Moores (1919–1920)
Colonel H. A. Hinge (1920–1922)
Colonel C. B. Martin (1922–1924)
Major-General C. W. Mainprise (1924–1925)
Colonel Henry Edward Manning Douglas VC (1925–1929)
Colonel John Southey Bostock CBE (1929–1930)
Major-General Sir Ralph Bignell Ainsworth Kt, CB, DSO, OBE (1930–1935)
Major-General William Porter MacArthur KCB (1935–1938)
Major-General William Brooke Purdon (1938–1940)
Major-General Francis Stephen Irvine (1940–1946)
Major-General E. B. Marsh (1946–1948)
Major-General John Dowse  (1948–1949)
Major-General J. M. Macfie (1949–1950)
Major-General F. R. H. Mollan (1950–1953)
Major-General F. C. Hilton-Sergeant (1953–1957)
Major-General W. D. Hughes (1957–1960)
Major-General Sir William Robert MacFarlane Drew (1960–1963)
Major-General Ambrose Neponucene Trelawney Meneces (1963–1966)
Major-General John Mackenzie Matheson (1969–1971)
Major-General James Baird (1971–1973)
Major-General Simon Gavourin (1973–1977)
Major-General Alan Reay (1977–1979)
Major-General Robert Noel Evans (1979–1981)
Major-General Joseph Porter Crowdy CB (1981–1984)
Major-General Patrick Crawford (1989–1993)
Major-General George Osborne Cowan (1993–1996)

References

Training establishments of the British Army
Art gallery districts
Former buildings and structures in the City of Westminster
Grade II listed buildings in the City of Westminster
Grade II listed hospital buildings
Medical units and formations of the British Army
Military history of London
Military installations closed in 1999
Millbank